The 2021-22 Czecho-Slovak Basketball Cup is the first edition of this tournament, which is refounded after 18 years. .

The tournament is organised from 3 September to 11 September and consists of twelve teams (6 from Czech Republic and 6 from Slovakia) divided in four groups of three teams in Regular Season and Final Four afterwards. Draw was held on 16 July 2021.

Teams

Regular season

Group A

Group B

Group C

Group D

Final Four 

<noinclude>

References 

C
2021–22 in Slovak basketball
2021–22 in Czech basketball